is a 1954 Japanese film directed by Katsuhiko Tasaka.

Cast 
 Raizo Ichikawa
 Takeharu Hanayagi
 Shintaro Katsu

See also 
Byakkotai (White Tiger Platoon)

References

External links 

Japanese black-and-white films
1954 films
Films directed by Katsuhiko Tasaka
Daiei Film films
1950s Japanese films